The Shadow DN12 was a Formula One car used by the Shadow team for the 1980 season, and was their last Formula One car chassis and entry. It was driven by Geoff Lees, and David Kennedy. It was powered by the commonly used  Cosworth DFV V8 engine. It only entered three races, making its debut at the 1980 Belgian Grand Prix. At the French Grand Prix that year, both drivers, Geoff Lees and David Kennedy failed to qualify, after which Shadow retired from Formula One permanently.

French Grand Prix
This race also saw the final appearance of Shadow Racing Cars. Geoff Lees and David Kennedy were 25th and 27th in qualifying in the Shadow DN12s meaning both drivers missed the 24-car grid. The team had been sold only two months previously to Macau-based businessman and motor racing team owner Teddy Yip. Yip's own race team Theodore Racing would emerge as a Formula One team in 1981.

References

Shadow Formula One cars